Presidential elections were held in Cyprus for the first time on 13 December 1959. Only two candidates contested the election; Makarios III, who was backed by EOKA and Ioannis Clerides, a member of the Democratic Union, who was also supported by AKEL. The result was a victory for Makarios III, who won 66.8% of the vote, although he did not take office until 16 August 1960. Voter turnout was 91.2%.

A separate election for Vice President of Cyprus took place. Fazıl Küçük was the only candidate, and was elected unopposed.

Electoral system
The elections were held using a two-round system; if no candidate received over 50% of the vote in the first round, a second round was to be held between the top two candidates. The constitution required the President of Cyprus to be a Greek Cypriot and the Vice-President to be a Turkish Cypriot. Greek Cypriots elected the President and Turkish Cypriots elected the Vice-President.

Results

References

1959 in Cyprus
Cyprus
Presidential elections in Cyprus
December 1959 events in Europe